Marc Oliveras Gabarre (born 20 December 1991, in Barcelona) is an alpine skier who competes for Andorra. He competed for Andorra at the FIS Alpine World Ski Championships in 2013 and 2015 and competed for Andorra at the 2014 Winter Olympics and in the 2015 Winter Universiade.

Career
He competed for Andorra at the FIS Alpine World Ski Championships 2013 in Schladming, Italy. He finished 27th in the Super Combined and 43rd in the Downhill. He failed to finish in the Super-G and the Giant Slalom. He competed for Andorra at the 2014 Winter Olympics. He finished 34th in the Super-G, finished 31st in the Combined, finished 38th in the Giant Slalom and 40th in the Downhill. At the 2015 Winter Universiade he won the first medal for the country at the event a silver medal in the Super-G.

Achievements

Winter Universiade

Winter Olympics

World Championships

Notes

References

External links 
 
 
 

1991 births
Living people
Skiers from Catalonia
Andorran male alpine skiers
Olympic alpine skiers of Andorra
Alpine skiers at the 2014 Winter Olympics
Alpine skiers at the 2018 Winter Olympics
Universiade medalists in alpine skiing
Universiade medalists for Andorra
Competitors at the 2015 Winter Universiade
Sportspeople from Barcelona